Return to Jupiter was an Australian television series, a 13-part follow-up to Escape from Jupiter. It aired in Australia from 23 March to 15 June 1997.

Plot
After their escape from Io, Michael, Kumiko, Gerard and Anna, last seen in Escape From Jupiter, are reunited on the Icarus, a solar cruiser that will take them back to their parents on Ganymede, one of Jupiter's moons. But the journey is far from a smooth one. Danger and excitement wait around every turn, as the children face a crash landing on Mars, hitch a ride on an asteroid, and race against two villains whose evil plan jeopardises the Icarus and its crew.

Cast
Sonia Todd as Cmdr Edwina Dent
David Wenham as Dr. Chrobak
Jeanette Cronin as Glovic
Colin Moody as Tobias Selby
Anna Choy as Kumiko
Justin Rosniak as Gerard
Daniel Taylor as Michael
Dominic Elmaloglou as Abraham
Robyn MacKenzie as Anna
Emma Jane Fowler as Zac

Episodes 
Episode information retrieved from IMDB.

See also 
 List of Australian television series

External links

 Return to Jupiter at the National Film and Sound Archive

References

Australian children's television series
Australian science fiction television series
Fiction set on Ganymede (moon)